Zil-e-Huma() (26 February 1944 – 16 May 2014) was a Pakistani singer and daughter of Noor Jehan.

Early life
Born to Jehan-Rizvi family, she was the youngest daughter of Noor Jehan and Syed Shaukat Hussain Rizvi from Noor Jehan's first marriage. Noor Jehan and Shaukat Hussain Rizvi together also had 2 older sons named Akbar Rizvi and Asghar Rizvi. Huma was born in 1944 in Lahore, Punjab, Pakistan, the youngest of the three children of singer Noor Jehan and filmmaker Syed Shaukat Hussain Rizvi.

When she was a child, her parents divorced. Her father demanded the family's studio Shahnoor Studios, in return for her custody in the divorce court and was given custody of the studios.

Career
Growing up with her mother in Karachi, singing and music became her passion but during her childhood, her mother Noor Jehan refused to allow her to undergo training in music.

In the early 1990s, after having decided to make music her profession, she commenced formal education in music under Ghulam Mohammed, her mother's Ustad (teacher). She said in an interview, "Learning at that age wasn't an easy game but I had made up my mind to keep on learning as learning never ends". Zil-e-Huma usually used to sing her mother's super-hit film songs on Pakistan Television.

Personal life
At an early age, she married a jeweler, Aqeel Butt, and settled down to a married life. She has four sons, Mohammad Ali Butt, Ahmed Ali Butt (lead vocalist of the Pakistani rock band E.P. and a film actor), Mustafa Ali Butt and Hamza Ali Butt. She eventually divorced her husband and decided to pursue a musical career.

Illness and death
Huma died on 16 May 2014 at a Lahore hospital from end-stage kidney disease (chronic kidney failure) and diabetes mellitus; she was 70 years old.

References

External links
 Picture of Zil-e-Huma

1944 births
People from Lahore
Pakistani women singers
Punjabi people
20th-century Pakistani women singers
Punjabi-language singers
2014 deaths
Punjabi women
Pakistani classical singers
Singers from Lahore
21st-century Pakistani women singers
Pakistani playback singers